The Sassendalen Group is a geologic group in Svalbard, Norway. The marine to deltaic mudstones, siltstones and sandstones preserve fossils dating back to the Early Triassic (Induan to Olenekian) period.

See also 
 List of fossiliferous stratigraphic units in Norway

References 

Geologic groups of Europe
Geologic formations of Norway
Triassic System of Europe
Triassic Norway
Induan Stage
Olenekian Stage
Mudstone formations
Siltstone formations
Sandstone formations
Deltaic deposits
Geology of Svalbard